"Turn It Up" is a song recorded by the South Korean singer-rapper T.O.P. It was released digitally on June 21, 2010, by YG Entertainment. The song was released as his first official single and was later included as bonus track on the albums: 2010 Big Show Live Album (2010), fourth live album of his group Big Bang and GD & TOP (2010), first studio album of his hip hop duo GD & TOP.

Background and release
"Turn It Up" has become public for the first time during BigBang's 2010 Big Show concert in January 2010. The song was released as a digital single on June 21, as part of the release of 2010 Big Show Live Album. On Gaon Chart "Turn It Up" peaked at number one in Download Chart, selling 1,380 million digital downloads in 2010. Within 24 hours the song achieved the highest international debut for a Korean Hip-Hop/rap single on iTunes Charts on the Hip-Hop/Rap category.

Music video
On June 14, 2010, a teaser of the music video was released on the YG Entertainment channel on YouTube. His video was officially released June 21, along with the digital single. Later, the video was banned from  MBC, because T.O.P mentions brand names, which is against MBC's broadcasting rules.

Track listing

Chart performance

Weekly charts

Year-end charts

Sales

References

2010 singles
2010 songs
T.O.P songs
YG Entertainment singles
Korean-language songs
Songs written by T.O.P
Black-and-white music videos